The State Social Service (SHSSH) is a government agency in Albania whose mission is to implement policies, legislation on economic assistance, as well as to ensure the coverage of wages and social services for the disabled through its network of 28 social care institutions and 12 regional centers around the country.

References

Service
Social Services agencies of Albania